Mehrabad often refers to Mehrabad International Airport, which serves Tehran, Iran.

Mehrabad or Mahrabad may also refer to:

East Azerbaijan Province
Mehrabad, East Azerbaijan, a village in Ajab Shir County

Fars Province
Mehrabad, Darab, a village in Darab County
Mehrabad, Fasarud, a village in Darab County
Mehrabad, Kharameh, a village in Kharameh County
Mehrabad, Lamerd, a village in Lamerd County
Mehrabad, Larestan, a village in Larestan County
Mehrabad, Juyom, a village in Larestan County
Mehrabad, Mamasani, a village in Mamasani County
Mehrabad, Pasargad, a village in Pasargad County

Hamadan Province
Mehrabad, Hamadan, a village in Malayer County

Isfahan Province
Mehrabad, Ardestan, a village in Ardestan County
Mehrabad, Zavareh, a village in Ardestan County
Mehrabad, Khvansar, a village in Khvansar County
Mehrabad, Kuhestan, a village in Nain County
Mehrabad, Lay Siyah, a village in Nain County
Mehrabad, Semirom, a village in Semirom County

Kerman Province
Mehrabad, Anar, a village in Anar County
Mehrabad, Bam, a village in Bam County
Mehrabad, Rafsanjan, a village in Rafsanjan County
Mehrabad, Shahr-e Babak, a village in Shahr-e Babak County

Khuzestan Province
Mehrabad, Ramshir, a village in Ramshir County

Kohgiluyeh and Boyer-Ahmad Province
Mehrabad, Kohgiluyeh and Boyer-Ahmad, a village in Kohgiluyeh County

Kurdistan Province
Mehrabad, Kurdistan, a village in Bijar County

Lorestan Province
Mehrabad-e Tudehrud, a village in Lorestan Province, Iran

Markazi Province
Mehrabad, Arak, a village in Arak County
Mehrabad, Khomeyn, a village in Khomeyn County

Mazandaran Province
Mehrabad, Mazandaran, a village in Juybar County

North Khorasan Province
Mehrabad, North Khorasan

Razavi Khorasan Province
Mehrabad, Chenaran, a village in Chenaran County
Mehrabad, Davarzan, a village in Davarzan County
Mehrabad, Jowayin, a village in Jowayin County
Mehrabad, Mashhad, a village in Mashhad County
Mehrabad-e Shor Shor, a village in Mashhad County
Mehrabad, Mazul, a village in Nishapur County
Mehrabad, Rivand, a village in Nishapur County

South Khorasan Province
Mehrabad, Khusf, a village in Khusf County
Mehrabad, Tabas, a village in Tabas County

Tehran Province
Mehrabad, Tehran
Mehrabad Rural District (Tehran Province)

Yazd Province
Mehrdasht, a city in Abarkuh County
Mehrabad Rural District (Yazd Province), in Abarkuh County
Mehrabad, Meybod, a village in Meybod County
Mehrabad-e Pain, a village in Meybod County

Zanjan Province
Mehrabad, Zanjan, a village in Zanjan County

See also
Mihrabad (disambiguation)